The Alex Wedding Prize is a German literary prize awarded to authors of works for children and young people. It is named after children's author Grete Weiskopf-Bernheim (1905–1966), who wrote under the pen name "Alex Wedding".

From 1968 to 1990 it was awarded by the Academy of Arts of the German Democratic Republic, and since then by its successor, the Academy of Arts, Berlin. An independent three-member jury awarded the prize, valued at €5,000, on Wedding's birthday, 11 May.

Winners

 1968: Willi Meinck
 1969: Karl Neumann
 1970: Kurt David
 1971: Joachim Nowotny
 1972: Götz R. Richter
 1973: Herbert Friedrich
 1974: Edith Bergner
 1975: Horst Beseler
 1976: Fred Rodrian
 1977: Peter Brock
 1978: Gotthold Gloger
 1979: Hans Weber
 1980: Hildegard and Siegfried Schumacher
 1981: Klaus Beuchler
 1982: Hannes Hüttner
 1983: Peter Abraham
 1984: Lilo Hardel
 1985: Werner Lindemann
 1986: Gunter Preuß
 1987: Wolf Spillner
 1988: Werner Heiduczek
 1989: Maria Seidemann
 1990: Walther Petri
 1991: Anne Geelhaar and Christa Kozik
 1992: Peter Hacks
 1998: Klaus Kordon
 2000: Benno Pludra
 2003: F. K. Waechter
 2008: Karla Schneider

References

Literary awards of Berlin
Children's literary awards
Young adult literature awards
1968 establishments in Germany
Awards established in 1968